Alejandra López Noriega (born 5 January 1970) is a Mexican politician affiliated with the PAN. She served as federal deputy of the LXII Legislature of the Mexican Congress representing Sonora, as well as a local deputy in the LIX Legislature of the Congress of Sonora.

López Noriega was born on 5 January 1970 in Hermosillo, Sonora. She earned her degree in industrial and systems engineering from the Universidad de Sonora in 1992.

She tested positive for COVID-19 in June 2020.

References

1970 births
Living people
People from Hermosillo
Politicians from Sonora
Women members of the Chamber of Deputies (Mexico)
National Action Party (Mexico) politicians
21st-century Mexican politicians
21st-century Mexican women politicians
Universidad de Sonora alumni
Members of the Congress of Sonora
Members of the Chamber of Deputies (Mexico) for Sonora